Francine Niyonsaba (born May 5, 1993) is a Burundian runner, who specialized in the 800 metres and shifted to longer distances in 2019. She was the 2016 Rio Olympics silver medalist in the women's 800 metres. Her silver medal was the first Olympic medal for Burundi since 1996. Niyonsaba won a silver in the event at the 2017 World Championships.

She is a two-time 800m world indoor champion, having won 800m in 2016 and 2018. After her move to longer distances, Niyonsaba finished fifth over the 10,000 metres at the 2020 Tokyo Olympics. She holds the world record in the 2000 metres, and seven Burundian records.

In 2019, World Athletics announced that Niyonsaba would not be allowed to compete under the female classification in events between 400 metres and one mile due to its regulations on XY DSD athletes with naturally high testosterone levels.

Career
Francine Niyonsaba quickly rose to prominence in 2012 while still a teenager. The first time she set the 800 metres record was in late June 2012 while narrowly winning the 2012 African Championships in Athletics in 1:59.11 in what was only her third competitive race. At that, she improved upon her own previous national record of 2:02.13, set in the qualifying round. In the opening round race, the inexperienced runner had opened up a 30 meters lead the pack. Three weeks later, on July 20, 2012, she improved the record again to 1:58.68 while finishing second at the 2012 Diamond League meeting at Herculis.

During the 2012 London Olympics, Niyonsaba reduced her own 800m record to 1:58.67 on August 9, 2012, in the semi-final round. It was a 0.01 seconds improvement on her previous record. Two days later, she finished seventh (subsequently upgraded to fifth as a result of the doping disqualifications of Russian athletes Elena Arzhakova and Mariya Savinova) in the final. Less than a month later, she took the record down to 1:56.59.

In 2016, Niyonsaba won the 800 meters at the 2016 IAAF World Indoor Championships in 2:00.01. She concluded her competition with her first Olympic medal, a silver in the women's 800m in a time of 1:56.49, behind Caster Semenya of South Africa.

Niyonsaba finished second in 800 meters seven race series of 2016 Diamond League. She improved her personal best to 1:56.24 at 2016 Herculis meet.

In 2017, Niyonsaba earned a new personal best and national record at the Monaco Diamond League after winning the 800m there in a time of 1:55.47 on July 21. With this time, she was the World No. 1. heading into the 2017 World Championships in London.

At the World Championships in London, she won a silver in the women's 800m in a time of 1:55.92. She led throughout the majority of the race, but Caster Semenya used her phenomenal final kick to pass the Burundian on the home stretch once again and win gold.

World Athletics ruling
In 2019, it was revealed that Niyonsaba was born with the 46,XY karyotype and an intersex condition after her qualification for IAAF women's competition was affected by the association's new regulations for athletes with XY differences of sexual development, testosterone levels above 5 nmol/L, and androgen sensitivity. Due to her stress fracture, Niyonsaba will have to miss the 2022 World Athletics Championships in Oregon.

Achievements

International competitions

Circuit wins and titles
 Diamond League champion 5000 m: 2021
 2012 (1 – 800 m): Brussels
 2013 (3 – 800 m): Shanghai, Eugene (WL ), Paris
 2016 (2 – 800 m): Birmingham (MR), Lausanne
 2017 (2 – 800 m): Stockholm, Lausanne
 2018 (2 – 800 m): Lausanne, Rabat
 2021 [4]: Eugene (two miles, MR), Paris (3000 m, WL MR NR), Brussels (5000 m, WL NR), Zürich (5000 m)
 2022 (2): Doha (3000 m, WL), Eugene (two miles, WL MR)

References

External links

1993 births
Living people
People from Ruyigi Province
Burundian female middle-distance runners
Olympic athletes of Burundi
Athletes (track and field) at the 2012 Summer Olympics
Athletes (track and field) at the 2016 Summer Olympics
Olympic silver medalists in athletics (track and field)
Olympic silver medalists for Burundi
Medalists at the 2016 Summer Olympics
World Athletics Championships athletes for Burundi
World Athletics Championships medalists
Intersex women
Intersex sportspeople
World Athletics Indoor Championships winners
Sex verification in sports
Athletes (track and field) at the 2020 Summer Olympics
Diamond League winners